David Cárdenas Cortés (born October 15, 1973) is a Mexican former professional baseball pitcher. He has played in Major League Baseball for the Atlanta Braves, Cleveland Indians, and Colorado Rockies (–).

Cortés was a member of the Mexicali, Mexico, team who were the runners-up of the 1985 Little League World Series. As a teenager, he left his family to attend high school and play baseball in El Centro, California. He was undrafted out of high school and next played college baseball at Imperial Valley College where he did not attract any attention from scouts. His grades were too poor for a four-year school and, after finishing junior college at 19, took a job at a department store for $4.75 per hour while pitching for an amateur team in Tijuana. Three years later, in 1996, with a three-month-old daughter at home, he was convinced to attend a Cincinnati Reds tryout in San Diego. The Reds did not sign Cortés on the grounds that he was too short at  but he was referred to an amateur team in San Diego, which he could afford to join only after being given $20 in gas money. Playing in San Diego, he impressed a Braves scout who was monitoring Marcus Giles; he received a signing bonus of $2,500 from the Braves.

On December 8, 2006, Cortés signed with the San Francisco Giants, but before pitching for the Giants, he was loaned to the Triple-A Mexican League where in  he made the midseason All-Star team. Cortés signed with the Lotte Giants of the Korea Baseball Organization in August  and served as their closer until the end of the season.

References

External links
  
David Cortés at Baseball Almanac

1973 births
2006 World Baseball Classic players
2009 World Baseball Classic players
Living people
Major League Baseball players from Mexico
Mexican expatriate baseball players in South Korea
Mexican expatriate baseball players in the United States
Atlanta Braves players
Cleveland Indians players
Colorado Rockies players
Major League Baseball pitchers
Sportspeople from Mexicali
Lotte Giants players
Eugene Emeralds players
Macon Braves players
Durham Bulls players
Greenville Braves players
Richmond Braves players
Colorado Springs Sky Sox players
Myrtle Beach Pelicans players
Tucson Sidewinders players
Buffalo Bisons (minor league) players
Toledo Mud Hens players
Baseball players from Baja California
Junior college baseball players in the United States